The men's 15 kilometre cross-country skiing competition at the 1972 Winter Olympics in Sapporo, Japan, was held on Monday 7 February at the Makomanai Cross Country Events Site.

Each skier started at half a minute intervals, skiing the entire 15 kilometre course. Lars-Göran Åslund of Sweden was the 1970 World champion and Harald Grønningen of Norway was the defending Olympic champion from the 1968 Olympics in Grenoble, France.

Results
Sources:

References

External links
 Final results (International Ski Federation)

Men's cross-country skiing at the 1972 Winter Olympics
Men's 15 kilometre cross-country skiing at the Winter Olympics